Clover Hill, also known as the Colonel Edmond Jones House, is a historic plantation house located near Patterson, Caldwell County, North Carolina.  It was built in 1846, and is a two-story, five bay, brick, Greek Revival-style house. It sits on a raised basement and has a hipped roof. It features a shed porch surmounted supported by four handsome fluted Ionic order columns.

The house was listed on the National Register of Historic Places in 1973.

References

External links

Plantation houses in North Carolina
Historic American Buildings Survey in North Carolina
Houses on the National Register of Historic Places in North Carolina
Greek Revival houses in North Carolina
Houses completed in 1846
Houses in Caldwell County, North Carolina
National Register of Historic Places in Caldwell County, North Carolina